Von Pohl is a surname. Notable people with the surname include:

Hugo von Pohl (1855–1916), German admiral
Maximilian Ritter von Pohl (1893–1951), German army and air force (Luftwaffe) officer

See also
 Pohl
 Pöhl
 Pohlman